Golangun (also Romanized as Golangūn; also known as Kolangūn) is a village in Ahram Rural District, in the Central District of Tangestan County, Bushehr Province, Iran. At the 2006 census, its population was 645, in 139 families.

References 

Populated places in Tangestan County